Beseler is a surname. Notable people with the surname include:

Elmer Beseler Harris (1939–2019), American businessman and political strategist
Georg Beseler (1809–1888), Prussian jurist and politician
Hans Hartwig von Beseler (1850–1921), German general

See also
Beseler company